Roscoe Hunter Orman (born June 11, 1944) is an American actor, writer, artist and child advocate, best known for playing Gordon Robinson, one of the central human characters on Sesame Street.

Early life and career
While a student at New York City's High School of Art and Design, Orman made his theatrical debut in the 1962 topical revue "If We Grow Up." He was an early member of the Free Southern Theater in New Orleans for two years in the mid-1960s and a founding member of Robert Macbeth's New Lafayette Theatre in Harlem, NY, where he both acted in and directed several plays by NLT's playwright-in-residence, Ed Bullins. His many other stage appearances have included roles in "Julius Caesar" and "Coriolanus" at Joseph Papp's Public Theater, the Broadway production of August Wilson's Pulitzer Prize-winning play "Fences", Manhattan Theatre Club's stagings of Richard Wesley's "The Sirens", "The Last Street Play", and "The Talented Tenth", and Matt Robinson's one-man play The Confessions of Stepin Fetchit at the American Place Theatre. Orman is the recipient of two Audelco Theatre Awards and a five-time nominee.

He made his feature film debut in the title role of Universal Studios' 1974 drama Willie Dynamite and has since appeared in F/X, Striking Distance, New Jersey Drive, Sesame Street Presents: Follow That Bird, Twilight's Last Gleaming, The Adventures of Elmo in Grouchland, Jeremy Fink and the Meaning of Life, Holiday Rush, and "You Can't Take My Daughter". His television credits include work on All My Children, Kojak, Sanford and Son, Cosby, Sex and the City, The Wire, Law & Order, and Law and Order: SVU. He appeared in the Garry Trudeau/Amazon streaming production Alpha House and the HBO mini-series The Night Of.

Orman joined the Sesame Street cast in 1974, becoming the third actor to play Gordon (after Matt Robinson, 1969–72, and Hal Miller, 1972–74).

In June 2006, Orman's memoir, Sesame Street Dad: Evolution of An Actor, was released. In September 2007, his children's book Ricky and Mobo was released.

On October 8, 2008, he became the Chief Storyteller of AudibleKids.com (a service of Audible.com), a website for parents, teachers, and children to connect with one another and download and listen to audiobooks on iPods, MP3 players, and computers. In this role, Orman narrates audiobooks and communicates with children, parents and teachers online and at events. His new role was announced at a community event at The Educational Alliance Boys & Girls Club in New York City, where Mayor Michael Bloomberg's office commended Orman's life work and willingness to embrace new technology to help encourage children to read books, by naming October 8, 2008, AudibleKids Day in New York City.

In 2016, his contract with Sesame Street was not renewed, as part of Sesame's Workshop's retooling of the series, but the organization said that Orman would continue to represent it at public events. He returned to play Gordon in Sesame Street's 50th Anniversary Celebration as well as a couple of YouTube videos released in 2018, a 2019 CNN town hall, Coming Together: Standing Up To Racism alongside former Sesame Street cast member Sonia Manzano, and a TV special released the same year, "The Power of We", also about racism.

Personal life
Orman has five children with his former partner Sharon Orman, and is the grandfather of eight. His son Miles Orman played Gordon and Susan's adopted son Miles Robinson on Sesame Street from the mid-1980s to the early 1990s. He and his wife, Kimberley LaMarque Orman, reside in New Jersey.

Filmography

References

External links
 Interview from Wisconsin Public Television with Roscoe Orman—the actor talks about his career and experiences playing Gordon Robinson on Sesame Street.
 
 
 
 
 Roscoe Orman Interview in the Archive of American Television
 Interview 'Sesame Street' star is an accidental role model - Associated Press

1944 births
Living people
People from Montclair, New Jersey
American children's writers
African-American male actors
African-American writers
Male actors from New Jersey
Writers from New Jersey
20th-century American male actors
American male film actors
American male singers
Singers from New York City
High School of Art and Design alumni
21st-century American male actors
20th-century African-American male singers
21st-century African-American people
Audiobook narrators